José Cláudio Lazzarotto (born 12 October 1958) is a Brazilian rower. He competed in the men's quadruple sculls event at the 1980 Summer Olympics.

References

External links
 

1958 births
Living people
Brazilian male rowers
Olympic rowers of Brazil
Rowers at the 1980 Summer Olympics
Place of birth missing (living people)
Pan American Games medalists in rowing
Rowers at the 1979 Pan American Games
Pan American Games silver medalists for Brazil
Medalists at the 1979 Pan American Games